The Companies Commission of Malaysia (abbreviated SSM), is a statutory body formed under an Act of Parliament that regulates corporate and business affairs in Malaysia. The SSM was formed in 2002 under the Companies Commission of Malaysia Act 2001, assuming the functions of the Registrar of Companies and Registry of Business.

The main purpose of SSM is to serve as an agency to incorporate companies and register businesses as well as to provide company and business information to the public. The commission launched SSM e-Info Services to allow information on companies and businesses obtainable via its website.

As the leading authority for the improvement of corporate governance in Malaysia, the commission also handles monitoring and enforcement activities to ensure compliance with business registration and corporate legislation.

In 2003, the SSM began a review of the Companies Act 1998, with the aim of simplifying the process of incorporation in Malaysia and reducing businesses' costs of compliance with Malaysian corporate law. This law was eventually replaced by Companies Act 2016, which carries some major changes such as only one director is needed to register the company as a Company Limited by Shares instead of two, heavier penalties on directors who do not comply with the Act, and Annual General Meeting (AGM) is no longer mandatory to be held by private companies.

Business owners can choose to incorporate their business as a Sole Proprietorship or Partnership, incorporate their company as a Company Limited by Shares, a Company Limited by Guarantee or a Company Unlimited, or incorporate a Limited Liability Partnership.

Registering a Sole Proprietorship or Partnership 
 Fill out Form A, the Business Registration Form, with the following information:
 Business Name
 Commencement Date
 Principal Place of Business
 Address of the Branches (if applicable)
 Owner and Partner(s) Information
 Type of Business
 Copy of the Partnership Agreement (if applicable)
 Submit the Form along with the following documents to the nearest SSM counter:-
 Photocopy of Owner and Partner(s) NRIC
 Permit, License or Supporting Letter for your Business (if applicable) - e.g. nurseries, which need a permit from the Department of Social Welfare
 Approval or Supporting Letter from Relevant Agency (if required by the Registrar of Business)
 Registration fees are available at SSM Website
Understand more on the differences of Sole Proprietorship and Partnership in Malaysia

Legal Framework
Acts and regulations that SSM operates under are listed as below:

Acts
Companies Commission of Malaysia Act 2001 (Act 614) as at 1 March 2018
Companies Act 2016 (Act 777) as at 1 November 2018
Companies Act 1965 (Repealed)
Interest Schemes Act (Act 778)
Registration of Businesses Act 2016 (Act 197) as at 1 June 2017
Limited Liability Partnerships Act (Act 743) as at 1 March 2017
Trust Companies Act 1949 (Act 100) as at 1 January 2006
Kootu Funds (Prohibition) Act 1971 (Act 28)

Regulations
Any subsidiary legislation made under the Acts specified above such as: Companies Regulations 1966; and Registration of Businesses Rules 1957.

 Companies Commission of Malaysia (Licensing of Secretaries) Regulations 2017
 Companies Regulations 2017
 Companies (Amendment) Regulations 2018
 Companies (Practising Certificate For Secretaries)  Regulations 2019
 Interest Schemes Regulations 2017
 Limited Liability Partnerships Regulations 2012
 Limited Liability Partnerships (Amendment) Regulations 2016

See also
 List of company registers

References

External links
 Official website
 
 Licensed Company to register new company in Malaysia
 Company registration Malaysia
 Company Registration in Malaysia
 Renew SSM Online

Federal ministries, departments and agencies of Malaysia
Economy of Malaysia
2002 establishments in Malaysia
Government agencies established in 2002
Ministry of Domestic Trade and Consumer Affairs (Malaysia)
Registrars of companies